Cats and Dogs is the sixth studio album by Swedish hard rock band Talisman released on 12 May 2003 on Frontiers Records.

The release of the album was followed by a tour in Europe, which included a headlining slot at Gods of AOR Festival in the UK, a performance at Frontiers Showcase in Italy, a new appearance at the Sweden Rock Festival and a show at the Lokerse Festival in Belgium

Track listing
 Cats side
 "Skin on Skin" - 3:21
 "Break It Down Again" - 3:49
 "In Make Believe" - 3:25
 "Love Will Come Again" - 4:12
 "Outta My Way" - 3:58
 "Friends to Strangers" - 3:13
 Dogs side
 "Sorry" - 3:45
 "Trapped" - 3:10
 "M.O.M" - 3:38
 "Wherever Whenever Whatever" - 3:44
 "Lost in the Wasteland" - 4:32
 "Hell in Paradise" - 4:29
 "Time" (Japanese edition bonus track) - 4:37

Credits

Talisman
Jeff Scott Soto – vocals
Fredrik Åkesson – guitar
Marcel Jacob – bass
Jamie Borger – drums

References
 Illuminati
 Talisman Discography

Talisman (band) albums
2003 albums
Frontiers Records albums